23 Squadron or 23rd Squadron may refer to:

Aviation squadrons
 No. 23 Squadron PAF, a unit of the Pakistan Air Force
 No. 23 Squadron RAAF, a unit of the Royal Australian Air Force
 23rd Squadron (Iraq), a unit of the Iraqi Air Force
 No. 23 Squadron RAF, a unit of the United Kingdom Royal Air Force
 23rd Fighter Squadron, a unit of the United States Air Force
 23rd Bomb Squadron, a unit of the United States Air Force
 23rd Aeromedical Evacuation Squadron, a unit of the United States Air Force
 23rd Flying Training Squadron, a unit of the United States Air Force
 Marine Air Control Squadron 23, a unit of the United States Marine Corps

Naval squadrons
 Destroyer Squadron 23, a formation of the United States Navy